Vulcanibacillus is a genus of bacteria from the family of Bacillaceae with one known species (Vulcanibacillus modesticaldus). Vulcanibacillus modesticaldus has been isolated from a hydrothermal vent from the Rainbow Vent Field.

References

Further reading 
 

Bacillaceae
Bacteria genera
Monotypic bacteria genera